Gloria Suie Chin (November 10, 1925 – October 16, 2016), known professionally as Maylia Fong, was an American actress.

Career
Fong was cast in her first film as the character Ming Ling in the 1947 romantic film Singapore, also starring Fred MacMurray, after she was spotted by the wife of producer Sidney Buchman in a Paramount canteen while visiting her sister in California. After her successful reception in Singapore, Fong portrayed a Chinese orphan in To the Ends of the Earth in 1948 starring Dick Powell and Signe Hasso. Fong then appeared in Boston Blackie's Chinese Venture (1949), Chinatown at Midnight (1949), Call Me Mister (1951) and Return to Paradise (1953). She was one of the few Asian-American actresses working in Hollywood at the time. She was referred to as the “first Chinese starlet since Anna May Wong” by Paramount Pictures official studio publicity.

Family life
Fong was born in Detroit, Michigan. In 1947, while visiting her sister in Los Angeles she met her future husband, Benson Fong. The pair wanted to get married, but they needed a steady income, so they started a chain of restaurants called Ah Fong (亞方).

After her last film in 1953, Return to Paradise, Fong retired from acting to focus on her family. She had five children with her husband Benson. Their names are Cynthia Fong (b. 1948), Preston Oden Fong (b. February 1950), Lori Fong (b. 1951), Pamela Fong (b. 1953), and Lisa Fong (b. 1957). Three of her five children (Pamela, Kwong, and Lisa) are also actors. Fong also had nine grandchildren at the time of her death in 2016.

Entrepreneurship
Fong and her husband successfully ran a chain of Chinese restaurants in Los Angeles County called Ah Fong. In 1949, they had saved up enough money to open their first restaurant location in Hollywood, California, on Vine Street. By 1971, the chain had locations in Hollywood, Anaheim, Encino, Westwood and Beverly Hills.

In 1984, the restaurant received a favorable recommendation in the Los Angeles Times as a place for Mother's Day lunch.

She and her husband stopped managing the chain in 1985, shortly before her husband's death in 1987. In 1987, only one location remained in Hollywood and was being managed by a relative.

Death
Fong died in her sleep at her home in Costa Mesa, California, on October 16, 2016. She was survived by her five children and nine grandchildren. Per her last wishes, she was cremated and her ashes scattered at sea.

Notes

References

External links

1925 births
2016 deaths
20th-century American actresses
Actresses from Detroit
American actresses of Chinese descent
American women restaurateurs
American restaurateurs
Paramount Pictures contract players
American film actresses
20th-century American businesswomen
20th-century American businesspeople